Vanda Kravčionok (Polish: Wanda Krawczonok, born 6 August 1969) is a politician from the Electoral Action of Poles in Lithuania and a member of the Twelfth Seimas of Lithuania. She is the deputy chairperson of the Electoral Action of Poles in Lithuania – Christian Families Alliance group.

Early life
Vanda Kravčionok was born in Vilnius District Municipality's Šilėnai village on 6 August 1969.

Career
From 1987 to 1991, Kravčionok was an operator at the manufacturing plant of AB Plasta. She joined the Union of Lithuanian Poles and the Electoral Action of Poles in Lithuania in 1994. Five years later, she became a treasurer of the latter and joined the Vilnius City Municipal Council in 2007. Prior to that, she worked as an assistant secretary to Valdemar Tomaševski.

In 2012, she became the deputy-chairperson of Electoral Action of Poles in Lithuania – Christian Families Alliance and entered the Lithuanian parliament, Seimas following the 2012 Lithuanian parliamentary election. She was a member of the Committee on State Administration and Local Authorities and Anticorruption Commission. She was re-elected in 2016.

References

1969 births
Living people
21st-century Lithuanian women politicians
21st-century Lithuanian politicians
People from Vilnius District Municipality
Members of the Seimas
Electoral Action of Poles in Lithuania – Christian Families Alliance politicians
Soviet people of Polish descent
Lithuanian people of Polish descent
Women members of the Seimas